= List of municipal presidents of Puerto Vallarta =

Following is a list of municipal presidents of Puerto Vallarta, in the Mexican state of Jalisco:

Term	Municipal president	Political party	Notes
1918	Jesús Langarica		
1919	Teodoro Ponce		
1919	Eduardo Guzmán		
1920	J. Buenaventura Santana		
1921	Lauro Morett		
1921–1922	J. Jesús Langarica		
1923	Gildardo Pellegot		
1924	Ramiro Gil		
1925	J. Roberto Contreras Quintero		
1926–1927	Marcos Guzmán		
1927	J. Guadalupe Novoa		Acting municipal president
1927	Sebastián Arreola		Acting municipal president
1927	Vicente Palacios		Acting municipal president
1928	??		
1929	Arturo Gómez Sánchez		
1929	Municipal Council presided over by G. Nuño		
1930	Pedro Silba Tovar	PNR	
1931	Gabriel Nuño Vicencio	PNR	
1932	Alfonso Bernal	PNR	
1932–1933	Cristóbal Ruelas	PNR	
1933	Antonio Pérez Camacho	PNR	
1934	Alfonso Garibaldi	PNR	
1934	Cristóbal Ruelas	PNR	
1935	Vicente Palacios	PNR	
1935	Gilberto González	PNR	Acting municipal president
1935	Vicente Palacios	PNR	
1936	J. de Jesús Rodríguez	PNR	
1937–1938	J. de Jesús Palacios	PNR; PRM	
1939–1940	Rodolfo Gómez Sánchez	PRM	
1941	Ignacio Mora	PRM	
1942	José Cervantes	PRM	
1942	Simón Andrade	PRM	Acting municipal president
1943–1944	Porfirio Uribe	PRM	
1945–1946	J. Encarnación Ahumada	PRM	
1946	Manuel Gutiérrez	PRI	
1947	Federico López Rivas	PRI	
1947	J. Roberto Contreras	PRI	Acting municipal president
1948	José María Guillén	PRI	
1949–1952	J. Roberto Contreras	PRI	
1953–1955	J. de Jesús Palacios Robles	PRI	
1955	Héctor Gómez	PRI	Acting municipal president
1956–1958	Gabriel Nuño Vicencio	PRI	
1959–1961	Juan Martínez Perales	PRI	
1962–1964	Carlos Arreola Lima	PRI	
1965–1967	Óscar Rosales Rodríguez	PRI	
1968–1970	José Vázquez Galván	PRI	
1971–1972	Marcelo Alcaraz Güereña	PRI	
1973	Luis Fabela Icaza	PRI	Acting municipal president
1974–1976	José Baumgarten Joya	PRI	
01/01/1977–31/12/1979	Eugenio Torres Ramírez	PRI	
01/01/1980–31/12/1982	Rafael González Pimienta	PRI	
01/01/1983–1985	Jorge Lepe García	PRI	
1985–31/12/1985	Abelardo García García	PRI	Acting municipal president
01/01/1986–31/12/1988	Aurelio Rodríguez Garza	PRI	
1989–1992	Efrén Calderón Arias	PRI	
1992–1994	Rodolfo González Macías	PRI	
1994–1995	Rafael Yerena Zambrano	PRI	
1995–1997	Fernando González Corona	PAN	
1997	Humberto Muñoz Vargas	PAN	Acting municipal president
01/01/1998–31/12/2000	David Cuevas García	PAN	
01/01/2001–2003	Pedro Ruiz Higuera	PAN	Applied for a leave
2003–31/12/2003	Ignacio Guzmán García	PAN	Acting municipal president
01/01/2004–31/12/2006	Gustavo González Villaseñor	PRI	
01/01/2007–31/12/2009	Francisco Javier Bravo Salazar	PRI	
01/01/2010–30/09/2012	Salvador González Reséndiz	PRI	
01/10/2012–06/03/2015	Ramón Demetrio Guerrero Martínez	PT; MC	Coalition "Progressive Alliance for Jalisco". Applied for a leave
06/03/2015–2015	Javier Pelayo Méndez	PT; MC	Coalition "Progressive Alliance for Jalisco". Acting municipal president
01/10/2015–27/02/2018	Arturo Dávalos Peña	MC	He applied for a temporary leave, to run for reelection
28/02/2018–30/09/2018	Rodolfo Domínguez Monroy	MC	Acting municipal president
01/10/2018–25/02/2021	Arturo Dávalos Peña	MC	He was reelected on 01/07/2018. Applied for a temporary leave to run for the deputation of local electoral district number 5 with head in Puerto Vallarta, which he didn't get, on 06/06/2021.
26/02/2021–30/09/2021	Jorge Antonio Quintero Alvarado	MC	Acting municipal president
01/10/2021–27/02/2024	Luis Alberto Michel Rodríguez	Morena	Applied for a leave
27/02/2024–30/09/2024	Francisco José Martínez Gil	Morena	Acting municipal president
01/10/2024–	Luis Ernesto Munguía González	PVEM	
